Bill Monaghan (born 28 August 1968) is the current coach of the East Fremantle Football Club and a former player for the Subiaco Lions and Peel Thunder. He previously coached West Perth from 2009 until 2018.

He played 204 games for Subiaco and Peel, captained Peel, and represented Western Australia at fullback.

He coached the Lions reserves to premierships in 2003 and 2005, and was an assistant coach under Peter German during the Lions' 2004 and 2006 premierships. When German stepped down in 2006, both German and most senior players favoured Monaghan to take over as senior coach, but the club board instead chose Scott Watters. In 2007 and 2008, Monaghan joined the Fremantle Football Club in a development role. He was appointed senior coach of West Perth for 2009, taking the team to the finals in his first year. Days after leading West Perth to the 2018 WAFL Grand Final, which they lost to Subiaco, Monaghan was sacked as West Perth's coach. He then took the vacant head coaching position at East Fremantle.

References

 Lewis, Ross (3 April 2009), "A bit of seasoning proved right recipe", The West Australian, Pre Game liftout, p. 10.

1968 births
Living people
Subiaco Football Club players
Peel Thunder Football Club players
West Perth Football Club coaches
Australian rules footballers from Western Australia
East Fremantle Football Club coaches